The Australia women's national beach handball team, also known as the Aussie Beach Gliders is the national team of Australia. It is governed by the Australian Handball Federation and takes part in international beach handball competitions.

Team
Head Coach: Andrew Kelso
Team Manager: Bernadette Coase

Selected Team for the World Championships 2018:

Birte Biehler, Daniela Borelli Dos Santos, Aminta Thomas, Heather Cooper, Ana Mejed, Madeleine McAfee, Rosalie Boyd, Vanja Smiljanic, Aline Viana, Manon Vernay

Captain: Aminta Thomas / Vice Captain: Daniela Borelli Dos Santos

Results

World Championships

World Games

Oceania Championship

References

Beach handball
Women's national beach handball teams
Beach handball
Women's handball in Australia